During the 1997–98 English football season, Sunderland A.F.C. competed in the Football League First Division.

Season summary
In the 1997–98 season, their first campaign at their new ground, Sunderland finished third in Division One. After beating Sheffield United in the Football League play-offs semi-final, they reached the final at Wembley with a place in the Premier League at stake. Over 40,000 fans travelled from the North-East to see the game against Charlton Athletic. The match was drawn 4–4 after extra time had been played; Charlton, however, won the game on a penalty shootout, after Michael Gray had his penalty saved by Charlton goalkeeper Saša Ilić.

Final league table

Results
Sunderland's score comes first

Legend

Football League First Division

First Division play-offs

FA Cup

League Cup

Players

First-team squad
Squad at end of season

Appearances and goals

|-
! colspan=14 style=background:#dcdcdc; text-align:center| Goalkeepers

|-
! colspan=14 style=background:#dcdcdc; text-align:center| Defenders

|-
! colspan=14 style=background:#dcdcdc; text-align:center| Midfielders

|-
! colspan=14 style=background:#dcdcdc; text-align:center| Forwards

|-
|}

References

Notes

Sunderland A.F.C. seasons
Sunderland